Akkiraju Haragopal (1958 – 14 October 2021), commonly known as Ramakrishna, alias R.K., was an Indian politician and Politbureau member of the Communist Party of India (Maoist). Haragopal was carrying a reward of 97 lakh Rs. at the time of his death.

Career
Haragopal was born in 1958 at Tumrugoti village, Palnadu, Guntur district in the state of Andhra Pradesh. After post graduation he worked as a teacher, joined in Radical Students Union, a student outfit of erstwhile People's War Group in 1978. He was active in Guntur district as secretary of Communist Party of India (Marxist–Leninist) People's War, district committee in 1986 and in 2001 he became the central committee member of this party. Haragopal was appointed as the Central committee of the CPI (Maoist) and incharge of Andhra-Odisha Border Special Zonal Committee after merging of People's War and Maoist Communist Centre. He headed the peace negotiation mission on behalf of the Maoist with the Andhra Pradesh government in 2004. In 2018 he was elevated to the Politbureau. After 4 decades of underground life he died due to kidney failure on 14 October 2021 at the age of 63. Haragopal was one of prime accused in the case of attack on Chandrababu Naidu, former Chief Minister Andhra Pradesh. His wife Sirisha is also a former Maoist activist and their son Munna was killed near Malkangiri in an encounter with police in October 2016.

References

1958 births
2021 deaths
Anti-revisionists
Communist Party of India (Maoist) politicians
Indian guerrillas
Indian Marxists
Naxalite–Maoist insurgency
People from Guntur district